Rollerblade Racer is a video game where the player's goal is to win the "super rollerblade challenge". The game was released for both the Nintendo Entertainment System and MS-DOS.

Gameplay
Players will first need to qualify by earning 5,000 points and completing several obstacle courses. These points are earned by performing stunts on suburbs, city streets, beaches, and parks. Additional points are earned by completing the course under the time limit. The main character is Kirk, who brags about purchasing a new pair of rollerskates.

References

1993 video games
DOS games
Hi Tech Expressions games
Nintendo Entertainment System games
North America-exclusive video games
Roller skating video games
Video games developed in the United States